Euryneura is a genus of soldier flies in the family Stratiomyidae. There are at least 8 described species of Euryneura.

Species
Dieuryneura stigma (Giglio-Tos, 1891)
Euryneura elegans Williston, 1888
Euryneura fascipennis (Fabricius, 1805)
Euryneura kerteszi Iide, 1968
Euryneura mexicana Kertész, 1908
Euryneura peruana Kertész, 1908
Euryneura propinqua Schiner, 1868
Euryneura pygmaea (Bellardi, 1862)
Euryneura robusta Kertész, 1908

References

Stratiomyidae
Brachycera genera
Taxa named by Ignaz Rudolph Schiner
Diptera of South America
Diptera of North America